Lu, or Luren (卢人), is an extinct Sino-Tibetan language of Guizhou, China. The Luren language may have been extinct since the 1960s.

Luren is closely related to Caijia and Longjia. However, the classification of these languages within Sino-Tibetan is uncertain. Zhengzhang (2010) suggests that Caijia and Bai form a Greater Bai branch, while Sagart argues that Caijia and Waxiang represent an early split from Old Chinese.

In Dafang County, Guizhou, the Lu people are located in Huangni 黄泥乡, Dashui 大水乡, Gamu 嘎木乡, and Shachang 纱厂镇 townships (Dafang County Gazetteer 1996:157).

See also
Greater Bai comparative vocabulary list (Wiktionary)

References

Further reading
Guizhou provincial ethnic classification commission, linguistic division [贵州省民族识别工作队语言组]. 1982. The language of the Caijia [Caijia de yuyan 蔡家的语言]. m.s.
Guizhou provincial ethnic classification commission [贵州省民族识别工作队]. 1984. Report on ethnic classification issues of the Nanlong people (Nanjing-Longjia) [南龙人（南京-龙家）族别问题调查报告]. m.s.
Hsiu, Andrew. 2013. "New endangered Tibeto-Burman languages of southwestern China: Mondzish, Longjia, Pherbu, and others". Presentation given at ICSTLL 46, Dartmouth College.
Zhao Weifeng [赵卫峰]. 2011. History of the Bai people of Guizhou [贵州白族史略]. Yinchuan, China: Ningxia People's Press [宁夏人民出版社]. 
Hölzl, Andreas. The Lu(ren) language of Guizhou, China. 9th International Contrastive Linguistics Conference (ICLC9). 2021.05.20-21.

Cai–Long languages